Esegine Allen (born 28 March 1986), better known by his stage name Orezi, is a Nigerian musician from Delta State. He rose to prominence with his song "Rihanna" in 2013.

In a chat with Showtime's The Cooking Pot the singer said that in the Nigerian music industry, having talent without money is a waste of time.

Early life and education 
Esegine "Orezi" Allen was born and raised in Owhelogbo, Isoko, Delta State. He is the first born of five children. Orezi attended the Command Secondary School in Abakaliki. He graduated from the University of Lagos and completed the mandatory one-year NYSC program.

Music career 
Orezi began his music career in early 2009. He has worked with several producers, including Kiddominant, Del B and Dokta Frabz. Orezi's debut song "I No Fit Lie" became Radio Continental's theme song. He headlined a show named after the song; the show was organised by the Continental Broadcasting Services (CBS). The music video for "I No Fit Lie" was shot in South Africa. In 2010, Orezi released the single "High B.P". The music video for the song was endorsed by MTV Base. In late 2010, he released the DJ JamJam-assisted track "Jamilaya".

In early 2011, Orezi was featured on "Emoti" alongside Danagog, Igho and DJ Debby. The song was played on Trace TV, MTV Base, Soundcity  and One Music. He was also featured on Jatt's single "Komije" alongside Sauce Kid, Muna and Igho. Orezi released the music video for the song "Booty Bounce"; it features cameo appearances from Karen Igho, Bovi, Wande Coal, Kay Switch, Sina Rambo, Vina, Danagog, Skuki and General Pype, among others. For several weeks, "Booty Bounce" was one of the top ten African songs on Trace Urban, Channel O and MTV. The music video for "Booty Bounce" was nominated for Most Gifted Reggae Video of the Year at the 2012 Channel O Music Video Awards.

In 2010, Orezi performed during Star Music Trek's visit to Kaduna and Makurdi, and also performed at an event celebrating Nigeria's 50th Independence Day. In early 2011, Orezi performed at DJ Jimmy Jatt's "Jump Off" show held at the Get Arena in Lekki. He has performed in several club tours in Nigeria and South Africa. He was part of the Emoti Tour organized by DJ Debby. Orezi performed at Club Inc in South Africa. In 2012, he performed at the Rhythm Unplugged concert in Ibadan, and toured with Trace Urban and St. Remy.

In March 2014, Orezi released the French version of his single "Shoki". He released the single "You Garrit" in 2014; the song's music video was released in September 2014. Orezi released his debut album The Ghen Ghen Album in September 2015. It features collaborations with 9ice, Davido, Flavour, Ice Prince, M.I Abaga, Timaya and Wizkid. Pulse Nigeria awarded the album 3 stars out of 5. In November 2015, Orezi released the music video for his single "Ogede". In September 2016, he released the controversial single "Call the Police".

Awards

Discography

Albums and EPs
I No Fit Lie (EP) (2010)
Ghen Ghen (2015)

Singles (partial)
 "Jamilaya" (featuring DJ Jam-Jam) (2010)
 "Rihanna" (2013)
 "Booty Bounce"
 "What Is the Need"
 "You Garrit"
 "Shoki "
 "Onome" (featuring DJ Akaba)
 "Shuperu"
 "Shuperu (Remix)" (featuring Davido)
 "Yagolono" (2016)
 "Sweet Yarinya"
 "My Queen" (2019)
"Your Body" featuring Teni (2020)

References

External links
Verified Twitter Account

Living people
1986 births
Musicians from Delta State
21st-century Nigerian male singers
Nigerian male singer-songwriters
Nigerian hip hop singers
Nigerian reggae musicians
University of Lagos alumni
Dancehall musicians